The Hôtel de Breteuil is a historic building in the 16th arrondissement of Paris, France.

History
The hôtel particulier was built for Henri Le Tonnelier de Breteuil and his second wife. It was designed by architect Ernest Sanson, and its construction was completed in 1892.

During the Christmastime of 1858, the hotel hosted a chess match between the American master Paul Morphy and Adolf Anderssen, part of Morphy's tour of Europe.  Morphy won the match handily, and Anderssen thrice employed an unusual opening—with mixed results—which came to bear his name.

It has since been the home for the Irish Embassy in France.

Gallery

References

Houses completed in 1892
Breteuil
Buildings and structures in the 16th arrondissement of Paris